Andrew Nathaniel Nelson (December 23, 1893 – May 17, 1975) was an American missionary and scholar of East Asian languages and literature, best known for his work in Japanese lexicography.

Biography
He was born in Great Falls, Montana to Swedish immigrant parents and earned his B.A. from Walla Walla University. In 1918, he began his long career of service in the Seventh-day Adventist missions of East Asia, where he gained particular distinction in the fields of general education and language training. The University of Washington awarded Nelson a Ph.D. in 1938 for his dissertation on The origin, history, and present status of the temples of Japan.

After retiring from missionary work in 1961, he was preoccupied with placing the finishing touches on his masterpiece, The Modern Reader's Japanese-English Character Dictionary, which first appeared in print the following year. The work, which was posthumously revised and expanded by a team led by John H. Haig at the University of Hawaii at Manoa, was reissued in 1997 as The New Nelson Japanese-English Character Dictionary; however, many scholars, teachers, and students continue to use the original edition of Nelson's dictionary, which has remained in print, because of changes made in Haig's edition that are viewed as impairing the functionality of the work. It is one of the most authoritative Kanji dictionaries for English learners of the language, and displays particular sensitivity to the difficulties they may have with the Kangxi radical system traditionally used to classify Kanji.

Nelson died in Hong Kong.

Administrator

Philippine Union College

While President of Philippine Union College, Nelson also served as a chaplain at the New Bilibid Prison. On January 19, 1951, he provided pastoral support for the fourteen executed that day, thirteen of them were part of the Nakamura Case.

Founded Mountain View College

Nelson describes the founding of Mountain View College in a report published in the March 17, 1953, Youth's Instructor. They established a list of criteria based on the values of Adventist Education and then explored the vast territory of the South Philippines looking for land which met the criteria.

Works 

Nelson's Kanji Dictionary

See also

Dwight Nelson
 Seventh-day Adventist Church
 Seventh-day Adventist theology
 Seventh-day Adventist eschatology
 History of the Seventh-day Adventist Church
 Teachings of Ellen G. White
 Inspiration of Ellen G. White
 Prophecy in the Seventh-day Adventist Church
 Investigative judgment
 Pillars of Adventism
 Second Coming
 Conditional Immortality
 Historicism
 Three Angels' Messages
 Sabbath in seventh-day churches
 Ellen G. White
 Adventism
 Seventh-day Adventist Church Pioneers
 Seventh-day Adventist worship

References

External links
Basic biographical details 
University of Washington library catalog entry for Nelson's Ph.D. thesis
"The Origin, History and Present Status of the Temples of Japan" thesis scanned text
 Nelson, Andrew N. Pioneering a New College in the Philippines. The Youth's Instructor. March 17, 1953, p. 12

1893 births
1975 deaths
Seventh-day Adventist religious workers
American lexicographers
Linguists from the United States
American expatriates in Japan
American Japanologists
Japanese literature academics
People from Great Falls, Montana
American people of Swedish descent
American Seventh-day Adventist missionaries
Walla Walla University alumni
Seventh-day Adventist missionaries in Japan
20th-century linguists
Missionary linguists
20th-century lexicographers